Jeffrey Alan Uhlenhake; born January 28, 1966) is a former American football center in the National Football League (NFL) for the Miami Dolphins, New Orleans Saints, and the Washington Redskins, and started 112 out of 119 games.

In 1996, he replaced John Gesek as the starting center of the Washington Redskins, playing in 11 games, Cory Raymer in 5. In 1997, he started 13 games, Raymer 3. But in 1998 Raymer took over as the starting center. 

Uhlenhake played college football with the Ohio State Buckeyes.  He was a four-year starter, playing left guard as a freshman and sophomore and center as a junior and senior.  Prior to his senior season his teammates elected him as a team co-captain.  That season, he was the team's only All-America selection, and his teammates voted him their Most Valuable Player.  In 2008, he was inducted into the Ohio State Varsity O Hall of Fame.

After a number of coaching stints, including one with the Cleveland Browns and Lehman Catholic High School, Uhlenhake has returned to Ohio State as a member of the football team's strength and conditioning program.

Uhlenhake is a graduate of Newark Catholic High School in Newark, Ohio where he played football under coach J D Graham.

He has also had a small role in "Ace Ventura: Pet Detective".

References

External links
 
 Ohio State profile

1966 births
Living people
American football centers
Cincinnati Bearcats football coaches
Cleveland Browns coaches
Miami Dolphins players
New Orleans Saints players
Ohio State Buckeyes football players
Washington Redskins players
High school football coaches in Ohio
Sportspeople from Newark, Ohio
Players of American football from Ohio
Players of American football from Indianapolis